Michael Ho Mun-ka, (born 6 November 1955) is a member of the Hong Kong Democratic Party and was the member of the Legislative Council of Hong Kong (1991–2000) for the Health Services (constituency).

References

1955 births
Living people
Democratic Party (Hong Kong) politicians
United Democrats of Hong Kong politicians
HK LegCo Members 1991–1995
HK LegCo Members 1995–1997
HK LegCo Members 1998–2000
Hong Kong nurses